Soudersburg is an unincorporated community and census-designated place (CDP) in East Lampeter and Leacock townships in Lancaster County, Pennsylvania, United States. As of the 2010 census the population was 540.

Geography
Soudersburg is in eastern Lancaster County, in the eastern corner of East Lampeter Township and the southwest corner of Leacock Township. It is bordered to the northwest by Ronks, to the northeast by Gordonville, and to the southeast by Paradise. U.S. Route 30, the Lincoln Highway, passes through Soudersburg, leading west  to Lancaster, the county seat, and east  to Coatesville.

Pequea Creek forms the southern boundary of the CDP and the border with Paradise Township. The creek is a southwest-flowing tributary of the Susquehanna River.

References

Census-designated places in Lancaster County, Pennsylvania
Census-designated places in Pennsylvania